Mohammad Omar Sani (born 6 May 1968), is a Bangladeshi film and television actor.

Career
Sani's film debut was in the 1990 film Chader Alo, directed by Shaikh Najrul Islam Khan. He acted in Prem Protishodh (1993) and Mohoth (1994). His met his future wife Moushumi at the film Dola (1994) and his first with Popy was Coolie (1997), directed by Montazur Rahman Akbar. After a 13-year hiatus from the film industry, he appeared in the film Ami Tumi Se, Pagol Tor Jonnore, Ajob Prem in 2013.

Personal life
Omar Sani comes from a family with strong ties to the Dhaliwood movie industry and well established actors in their own rights. On 2 August 1996, Sani married actress Moushumi. They have a son, Fardin Ehsan Shadin, and a daughter, Faiza.

Filmography

References

External links
 

1968 births
Living people
Bangladeshi male television actors
Bangladeshi male film actors
20th-century Bangladeshi male actors
21st-century Bangladeshi male actors
People from Khulna